The Malay Union was a political party in Singapore.

History
The party was established on 14 May 1926 as a religious and cultural organisations for the Malay community. In 1954 it was one of three parties that allied to form the Labour Front alongside the Democratic Labour Party and Singapore Socialist Party. When a decision was made to merge into a single party, the Malay Union withdrew from the alliance, and joined the Singapore Alliance alongside the United Malays National Organisation (whose Singaporean branch had been founded by the leaders of the Malay Union) and the Malayan Chinese Association.

In the 1955 general elections the party nominated a single candidate, Mohamed Sidik bin Haji Abdul Hamid, in the Southern Islands constituency. He was elected with 50.6% of the vote.

The party fielded a candidate in the 1957 by-election in Cairnhill, receiving 17% of the vote. However, the party had previously agreed with the other Alliance members not to field a candidate, and was subsequently expelled from the Alliance for doing so.

After trying but failing to form an alliance with the Pan-Malayan Islamic Party and Parti Rakyat, the MU contested the 1959 general elections alone. By this time the party was led by Muda Muhamed Mahmud, as Abdul Hamid had left to join the UMNO. It nominated three candidates, but received only 0.5% of the voting, failing to win a seat.

After the Societies Ordinance came into force in 1960, it failed to re-register.

References

Defunct political parties in Singapore
Political parties established in 1926
1926 establishments in Singapore
Malays in Singapore